Maksudul Ahsan (born February 3, 1966) is a Bangladeshi artist and poet.

Early life 
Ahsan was born in Chandpur. In 1987, he graduated from the Institute of Fine Arts of Dhaka University. In 1989, he obtained a master's degree there. In 1992, he received a diploma from the Academy of Planning and Development.

Career 
In 1989 he became a teacher of the College of Art in Khulna. In 1991 he became artistic editor of the weekly Shamoy Songglap in Dhaka. From 1994 to 2002, he lived and worked in Delhi (India). In 2008–2009, he  was the editor of the weekly Shubarno Shodesh. In 2011 he became the chief executive director of the Gallery of Modern Art "Basilo" (Dhaka).

Creativity 
He produces moderately realistic as well as abstract images. He illustrates books. He published two collections of poems, Bashwashi Korotol and Shoundarjyer Staba, in 1989.

Exhibitions 
The first solo exhibition of the artist took place in the gallery "La Gallery" in Dhaka in 1994. Since then he has held 12 solo exhibitions in Bangladesh, India and Canada, and participated in more than 40 collective exhibitions in his homeland and abroad (India, Canada, Malaysia). In 2016, the National Gallery of Bangladesh held a retrospective, dedicated to the 25th anniversary of his creative activity. He organized eight art workshops in Dhaka, Delhi and Calcutta with the participation of artists from the countries of the South Asian Association for Regional Cooperation (SAARC).

Collections
The artist's paintings are kept in the National Museum of Bangladesh, in the National Picture Gallery of Bangladesh, in the Shilpakala Academy (Dhaka), in the Sheraton and Pan Pacific Sonargaon hotels, the Ravi Jain Memorial Foundation in Delhi, the Dhohomi Mal and "Kunika" galleries (Delhi), as well as in private collections in Australia, England, Bangladesh, Germany, India, Canada, China, the Netherlands, Pakistan, Switzerland and the US.

Social activities 
He is one of the founders of the society "Jania Abritti Charcha Kendra" (1987), executive director of the South Asian Society of Art and Culture (since 2003), and secretary general of the Arts and Cultural Society "Bandhan" (since 2004).

References

Bengali male artists
Modern painters
Artists from Dhaka
20th-century Bangladeshi painters
20th-century Bangladeshi male artists
1966 births
Living people
University of Dhaka alumni
21st-century Bangladeshi painters
21st-century Bangladeshi male artists